Protein DGCR14 is a protein that in humans is encoded by the DGCR14 gene.

This gene is located within the minimal DGS critical region (MDGCR) thought to contain the gene(s) responsible for a group of developmental disorders. These disorders include DiGeorge syndrome, velocardiofacial syndrome, conotruncal anomaly face syndrome, and some familial or sporadic conotruncal cardiac defects which have been associated with microdeletion of 22q11.2. The encoded protein may be a component of C complex spliceosomes, and the orthologous protein in the mouse localizes to the nucleus.

References

Further reading